There have been 17 Formula One drivers from the Netherlands who have taken part in races since 1952. Max Verstappen is the most successful Dutch driver, as the only one to have won a Formula One World Championship, to have won races, one of two drivers to have finished on the podium of a Grand Prix (the other being his father Jos Verstappen), the one to score most career points, and the only one to have achieved a pole position.

Current drivers
Aged 17 years and 166 days, he became the youngest Formula One driver in history. On 15 May 2016, he became the youngest driver to win a Grand Prix, aged 18 years, 7 months and 15 days, at the 2016 Spanish Grand Prix. On 12 December 2021, he became the first Dutch driver to win a Formula One World Championship. He has been driving for Red Bull Racing since the 2016 Spanish Grand Prix and is due to drive for them until the end of the 2028 season.

Nyck de Vries replaced Alex Albon, who pulled out suffering from appendicitis, at Williams for the 2022 Italian Grand Prix. This was de Vries's Formula One debut, he had previously served as a practice driver, including for once for Williams, and for Aston Martin at the Grand Prix before Albon's withdrawal. He later signed for Scuderia AlphaTauri for  replacing Pierre Gasly who moved to Alpine.

Former drivers

1950s and 1960s
At the 1952 Dutch Grand Prix, Jan Flinterman and Dries van der Lof were the first Dutch drivers to participate in a Formula One race; for both drivers, it was their only one. In 1957, Carel Godin de Beaufort was the first regular Dutch Formula One driver, and the first Dutch driver to score points, driving in 31 races between 1957 and 1964, before  crashing fatally at the 1964 German Grand Prix.

Three Dutch drivers were entered for the 1962 Dutch Grand Prix: besides Carel Godin de Beaufort, who drove the entire 1962 Formula One season, Ben Pon drove in his first and only Formula One Grand Prix as de Beaufort's teammate. Rob Slotemaker was entered for the race, but did not participate because his car was not ready in time.

1970s and 1980s

In , Roelof Wunderink entered 6 Grands Prix for Ensign, but scored no points.

At the 1979 Argentine Grand Prix, Jan Lammers started his Formula One career with Shadow. In 1980, he qualified a spectacular fourth place for the United States Grand Prix West at Long Beach in an ATS, but failed to score any points after a retirement. In , after 39 Grands Prix, Jan Lammers retired from Formula One for a more successful career in sportscars, winning the 1988 24 Hours of Le Mans and the 1990 Daytona 24 Hours. In 1992, Lammers made a two-race comeback in Formula One for March, in Japan and Australia. These races marked his first Formula One appearance since 1982, which is a still-standing record for the longest gap between successive Grands Prix in Formula One . He was signed for the team in 1993 but the team went bankrupt before the season started.

In , Huub Rothengatter made his debut for what was to become a career of 30 races over 3 years, although he scored no points, he would later become the manager of Jos Verstappen.

1990s  and 2000s

At the end of 1993 Jos Verstappen, after impressing in Formula Opel Lotus and Formula Three, was one of the most wanted upcoming drivers. Verstappen became the default race driver in France, and would go on to score a podium in Hungary and Belgium. This would mark the beginning of a career mostly spent in mid-field and back-field teams such as Arrows, Tyrrell and Minardi. After a career in which he drove 107 Grands Prix, spanning 9 years and scoring 17 points, Verstappen retired after the 2003 Japanese Grand Prix.

 
After impressing in Formula Three and finishing Rookie of the Year International Formula 3000 with a victory in Belgium in 2004, Robert Doornbos was hired as Friday test driver for Jordan Grand Prix for the 2004 Chinese Grand Prix. Doornbos impressed as test driver for the final few races of the season, and was reappointed for the 2005 season, although he raced with a Monegasque racing license that year. At the 2005 German Grand Prix, he joined fellow Dutch driver Christijan Albers at Minardi, who debuted earlier that year as the team's regular driver. In , Doornbos was appointed Friday test and reserve driver at Red Bull Racing, and would replace Christian Klien for the last 3 races of the season. After just 11 races over 4 years time, his Formula One career ended as he went to drive the Champ Car World Series in 2007.

Following two successful seasons in DTM, Christijan Albers made his debut in the 2005 Australian Grand Prix for Minardi. Aside from a 5th point finish in the 6-car 2005 United States Grand Prix though, Albers's career was largely unsuccessful. He was released by Spyker after driving 46 races following the 2007 British Grand Prix.

2010s and 2020s 
However, due to contract conflicts with Spyker, who had also signed him as test and reserve driver, he ended up not taking part in any Grand Prix. Following good results in the GP2 Series, Van der Garde was signed as test and reserve driver for Caterham in Formula One, while racing for the team in GP2. Following the threat of follow-up action in Malaysia, all charges were dropped and van der Garde left Formula One.

Following a successful rise through the karting ranks and a very successful first year in the FIA Formula 3 European Championship, Max Verstappen, son of former F1 driver Jos Verstappen, joined the Red Bull Junior Team. On 18 August 2014, it was announced that he would debut in Formula One in 2015 for the Toro Rosso team. He won the 2016 Spanish Grand Prix in his debut race for Red Bull at the age of 18, becoming the youngest-ever winner of a Grand Prix and the first racing under the Dutch flag. He has raced for Red Bull since the 2016 Spanish Grand Prix and is due to race with them until .

Timeline

* Was entered for the 1962 Dutch Grand Prix, but did not participate because his car was not ready in time.

See also
 List of Formula One Grand Prix winners
 List of Formula One drivers

References